Randolph Springs is an unincorporated community in Randolph County, in the U.S. state of Missouri.

History
A post office called Randolph Springs was established in 1888, and remained in operation until 1902. The community took its name from a mineral spring near the original town site.

References

Unincorporated communities in Randolph County, Missouri
Unincorporated communities in Missouri